The 2014–15 National First Division was played from September 2014 until May 2015, and is the second tier of South Africa's professional football.

League table

References

External links
PSL.co.za

National First Division seasons
South
2014–15 in South African soccer leagues